The Gate of Harmonious Interest (同濟門, Pinyin: Tóngjì mén) is a gate located in Chinatown, Victoria, British Columbia. The gate was completed in 1981, and it spans Fisgard Street, west of Government Street.

References

External links

 

Buildings and structures in Victoria, British Columbia
Gates in Canada
Outdoor sculptures in Victoria, British Columbia